In physics, an observable is a physical quantity that can be measured. Examples include position and momentum. In systems governed by classical mechanics, it is a real-valued "function" on the set of all possible system states. In quantum physics, it is an operator, or gauge, where the property of the quantum state  can be determined by some sequence of operations. For example, these operations might involve submitting the system to various electromagnetic fields and eventually reading a value. 

Physically meaningful observables must also satisfy transformation laws that relate observations performed by different observers in different frames of reference. These transformation laws are automorphisms of the state space, that is bijective transformations that preserve certain mathematical properties of the space in question.

Quantum mechanics 

In quantum physics, observables manifest as linear operators on a Hilbert space representing the state space of quantum states. The eigenvalues of observables are real numbers that correspond to possible values the dynamical variable represented by the observable can be measured as having. That is, observables in quantum mechanics assign real numbers to outcomes of particular measurements, corresponding to the eigenvalue of the operator with respect to the system's measured quantum state. As a consequence, only certain measurements can determine the value of an observable for some state of a quantum system. In classical mechanics, any measurement can be made to determine the value of an observable.

The relation between the state of a quantum system and the value of an observable requires some linear algebra for its description.  In the mathematical formulation of quantum mechanics, up to a phase constant, pure states are given by non-zero vectors in a Hilbert space V. Two vectors v and w are considered to specify the same state if and only if  for some non-zero . Observables are given by self-adjoint operators on V. Not every self-adjoint operator corresponds to a physically meaningful observable. Also, not all physical observables are associated with non-trivial self-adjoint operators. For example, in quantum theory, mass appears as a parameter in the Hamiltonian, not as a non-trivial operator. For the case of a system of particles, the space V consists of functions called wave functions or state vectors. 

In the case of transformation laws in quantum mechanics, the requisite automorphisms are unitary (or antiunitary) linear transformations of the Hilbert space V.  Under Galilean relativity or special relativity, the mathematics of frames of reference is particularly simple, considerably restricting the set of physically meaningful observables.

In quantum mechanics, measurement of observables exhibits some seemingly unintuitive properties.  Specifically, if a system is in a state described by a vector in a Hilbert space, the measurement process affects the state in a non-deterministic but statistically predictable way. In particular, after a measurement is applied, the state description by a single vector may be destroyed, being replaced by a statistical ensemble.  The irreversible nature of measurement operations in quantum physics is sometimes referred to as the measurement problem and is described mathematically by quantum operations. By the structure of quantum operations, this description is mathematically equivalent to that offered by the relative state interpretation where the original system is regarded as a subsystem of a larger system and the state of the original system is given by the partial trace of the state of the larger system.

In quantum mechanics, dynamical variables  such as position, translational (linear) momentum, orbital angular momentum, spin, and total angular momentum are each associated with a Hermitian operator  that acts on the state of the quantum system. The eigenvalues of operator  correspond to the possible values that the dynamical variable can be observed as having. For example, suppose  is an eigenket (eigenvector) of the observable , with eigenvalue , and exists in a Hilbert space. Then

This eigenket equation says that if a measurement of the observable  is made while the system of interest is in the state , then the observed value of that particular measurement must return the eigenvalue  with certainty. However, if the system of interest is in the general state , then the eigenvalue  is returned with probability , by the Born rule.

The above definition is somewhat dependent upon our convention of choosing real numbers to represent real physical quantities. Indeed, just because dynamical variables are "real" and not "unreal" in the metaphysical sense does not mean that they must correspond to real numbers in the mathematical sense.

To be more precise, the dynamical variable/observable is a self-adjoint operator in a Hilbert space.

Operators on finite and infinite dimensional Hilbert spaces 
Observables can be represented by a Hermitian matrix if the Hilbert space is finite-dimensional. In an infinite-dimensional Hilbert space, the observable is represented by a symmetric operator, which may not be defined everywhere. The reason for such a change is that in an infinite-dimensional Hilbert space, the observable operator can become unbounded, which means that it no longer has a largest eigenvalue. This is not the case in a finite-dimensional Hilbert space: an operator can have no more eigenvalues than the dimension of the state it acts upon, and by the well-ordering property, any finite set of real numbers has a largest element. For example, the position of a point particle moving along a line can take any real number as its value, and the set of real numbers is uncountably infinite. Since the eigenvalue of an observable represents a possible physical quantity that its corresponding dynamical variable can take, we must conclude that there is no largest eigenvalue for the position observable in this uncountably infinite-dimensional Hilbert space.

Incompatibility of observables in quantum mechanics 
A crucial difference between classical quantities and quantum mechanical observables is that the latter may not be simultaneously measurable, a property referred to as complementarity. This is mathematically expressed by non-commutativity of the corresponding operators, to the effect that the commutator

Observables corresponding to non-commuting operators are called incompatible observables. Incompatible observables cannot have a complete set of common eigenfunctions.

See also
 Measure (physics)
 Observable universe
 Observer (quantum physics)
 Table of QM operators
 Unobservable

References

Further reading 

Quantum mechanics